Galkynysh from Tukmen translated as Renaissance. May also refer to:

Galkynysh gas field, a gas field in Turkmenistan
Galkynyş yacht, a yacht of Turkmenistan Government
Galkynyş, a town in Turkmenistan
Galkynyş District, a district of Lebap Province in Turkmenistan.